Darko Bajić (born on 14 May 1955) is a Serbian film director. He directed many movies and TV series popular with Serbian audience such as War Live, The Black Bomber, Sivi dom and Zaboravljeni.

Filmography

 Sivi dom (1985), TV series
 Zaboravljeni (1989), TV series
 The Black Bomber (1992), film
 War Live (2000), film

References

1955 births
Living people
Film people from Belgrade
Serbian film directors